Shota Laperadze (1929-1995) was a Georgian film producer who produced twenty films between 1959 and 1995. From 1959 to 1991 he worked as a film producer at Georgian Film Studio. Later, from 1991 to 1995, Laperadze was a head of the film unions - “Aisi” and “Caucasus.” He has been a member of the Film-makers' Union of Georgia since 1978.

In 1974 he received an award as a best film producer for the film Mze Shemodgomisa (Autumn Sun). Especially fruitful was Laperadze's cooperation with Georgian film director Rezo Chkheidze; together they made eight films, including Father of a Soldier (1964), which was entered into the 4th Moscow International Film Festival and The Saplings (1972); the film was entered into the 8th Moscow International Film Festival where it won a Diploma.

At the same time Laperadze successfully worked with other outstanding film directors such as Otar Iosseliani, Georgiy Shengelaya and Temur Babluani. In 1975 Laperadze produced Otar Iosseliani`s film Pastorale, the film received an award on Berlin International Film Festival in 1982.

Filmography
 The Fallen Angel -1992.
 The Life of Don Quixote and Sancho -1989 (TV Mini-Series).
 Brother -1981.
 Earth, This Is Your Son -1980.
 My Friend, Uncle Vania - 1978.
 Return -1977.
 Bakula`s Pigs -1976.
 Errantry -1975.
 Pastorali - 1975.
 The Wager - 1975.
 Flowering Acacia -1974.
 Autumn Sun -1973.
 The Saplings -1972.
 Peola  - 1970.
 The Star of My City -1970.
 Look at These Young People -1969.
 Matsi Khvitia -1966.
 Father of a Soldier -1964.
 Seashore Path -1962.

References

External links
 http://www.geocinema.ge/ge/prod.php?kod5=404
 https://www.imdb.com/name/nm0487446/
 https://pipl.com/directory/name/Laperadze/Shota/

1930 births
1995 deaths
Film directors from Georgia (country)
Screenwriters from Georgia (country)
Soviet film producers
20th-century screenwriters